Calomeria amaranthoides, the incense plant, is a plant species which is native to New South Wales and Victoria in Australia.

Description 
Calomeria amaranthoides is a tall, fragrant biennial herb, growing to 3.5 metres in height. It has sticky stems and leaves which are green above and whitish beneath and are up to 15 cm long and 5 cm wide. Its flowers appear in large brown to red plumes in the summer (January to April in its native range).

References 

Asterales of Australia
Flora of New South Wales
Flora of Victoria (Australia)
Gnaphalieae